The College of Education, Akamkpa is a state government higher education institution located in Akamkpa, Cross River State, Nigeria. The current Provost is James Archibong. The Deputy Provost is Ugbong Benedict Igboh while the Registrar is Bernard Okon. The Bursar is Daniel Abip while the Librarian is James Odu.

History 
The College Of Education, Akamkpa was established in 2008.

Courses 
The institution offers the following courses;

 English Education
 Chemistry Education
 Geography
 Music
 Biology Education
 Home Economics
 Economics Education
 Education and Mathematics
 Integrated Science Education
 Early Childhood Care Education
 French
 Political Science Education
 Christian Religious Studies
 Agricultural Science and Education

Librarian
The College Librarian is James Odu.
He was born on the 6th day of May, 1966 in Bankpor Irruan, (His home town) Boki L.G.A of Cross River State. He had his first Degree in Library Science/History from the University of Nigeria, Nsukka in 1992 where He graduated with second class Honour, (Upper division). He had his master's degree in the University of Calabar in Library and Information Science in 2003 and Ph.D. in Library and Information Science in University of Uyo, in 2012. He joined the services of the University of Calabar in 1997 as graduate assistance. He has published in both Local and Foreign Journal. He is a Member of Nigeria Library Association, Cross River State chapter and has attended several conferences.

References 

Universities and colleges in Nigeria
2008 establishments in Nigeria